The Saint Pierre River is a tributary of the Mascouche River, flowing in the southwest of Quebec, in Canada. This river crosses administrative regions:
Laurentides: Thérèse-De Blainville Regional County Municipality; municipality of Sainte-Anne-des-Plaines;
Lanaudière: Les Moulins Regional County Municipality; sector La Plaine of the city of Terrebonne and the city of Mascouche.

This river runs eastward from an agricultural plain at the north side of several urban areas, in parallel with the Rivière des Mille Îles.

Geography 

St. Pierre River rises on the north side of the village of Sainte-Anne-des-Plaines. This source is located at:
  north-west of Rivière des Mille Îles;
  north-east of the airport terminal to the Mirabel Airport;
  northwest from the confluence of the Saint Pierre River.

Course of the river

  north-east to the edge of the town of Mascouche (Les Moulins Regional County Municipality);
  to the northeast in the La Plaine of the city of Terrebonne, to the main street of the village "La Plaine";
  eastward to the main road serving the village "Domaine du Boisé";
In the city of Mascouche, winding up to the confluence of the river

The confluence of the Saint Pierre River empties into a river bend on the north bank of the Mascouche River, is north of the urban area of the city of Mascouche.

Toponymy

On the Christian origin, the place name is known since the beginning of the concession of the Seigneurie des Plaines, circa 1731. The settlers began clearing lots before 1740 along the St. Pierre River, which allowed a winter ice road before the development of roads along the river. This name is attested the first time in 1853 with exact location on the map of Francis Joseph Bouchette. The erection of documents of the parish of Mascouche, 1829-1831, indicate that the St. Pierre River has been designated "Ruisseau de la Plaine". Joseph Bouchette map of 1831 indicates that stream "Riv. St Mary ", echoing the designation appearing in a confession and enumeration of Seigneurie de Terrebonne in 1736.

The place name "Saint Pierre River" was formalized December 5, 1968, at the Bank of place names of Commission de toponymie du Québec (Quebec Geographical Names Board).

See also 

Sainte-Anne-des-Plaines, a municipality
La Plaine, an area of the city of Terrebonne
Terrebonne, a city of the north shore of Montreal
Mascouche, a city
Les Moulins Regional County Municipality (RCM)
Mascouche River, a stream
Rivière des Mille Îles, a stream
List of rivers of Quebec

References 

Rivers of Laurentides
Rivers of Lanaudière
Tributaries of the Saint Lawrence River